On 24 January 2022, a protest erupted in Brussels, Belgium against COVID-19 rules. More than 50,000 people began the protest at the capital's Nord Station and ended at Sycamorenter Park, near European institutions. On 24 January The demonstration was fixed with the administrators that this demonstration will end at 2 pm, but when it was not done by 3 pm, the police started the action to disperse protesters. Police arrested about 250 people before the breakdown and protested devices in their custody. At the end of the protest, police and protesters were also encountered, in which the police used tear gas and water cannons.

But a few dozen protesters spread to the surrounding streets, from where government buildings were attacked and many things, including cars and motorcycles, were set on fire, including the European Foreign Affairs EEAS building on Plus Schumacher.


Aftermath
The European External Action Service also protested in a tweet. The European Union's foreign affairs chief, Josep Borrell, also inspected the items, including the broken door.

Reactions
Various politicians, including government officials in the capital, Brussels, have expressed outrage at the loss, calling it against the spirit of freedom of expression enjoyed under democracy.

References

2022 in Belgium
2022 protests
COVID-19 pandemic in Belgium
2020s in Brussels
January 2022 events in Belgium
Protests in Belgium
Protests over responses to the COVID-19 pandemic